Huang Feng-shih (born 9 December 1949) is a Taiwanese politician.

He is the fifth son of puppeteer Huang Hai-tai. Huang Shih-feng studied film at National Taiwan University of Arts. He was sworn in to the Legislative Yuan on 28 October 2004, replacing Lee Ho-shun, who had resigned.

References

1949 births
Living people
Kuomintang Members of the Legislative Yuan in Taiwan
Members of the 5th Legislative Yuan
Party List Members of the Legislative Yuan
National Taiwan University of Arts alumni